Alpha Mande Diarra is a Malian author, born in 1954. He studied veterinary medicine in France at the Ecole Nationale Vétérinaire d'Alfort. (National Veterinary School at Alfort in Maisons-Alfort, Val-de-Marne, France) He is a practicing veterinarian at Bamako and Fara in his native Mali.

Bibliography
 1981 Sahel, sanglante sécheresse - Présence Africaine
 1994 La Nièce de l'Imam - Editions Sepia
 1999 Rapt à Bamako (with Marie-Florence Ehret) - Editions Le Figuier/EDICEF

References

1954 births
Living people
Malian writers
Male veterinarians
People from Bamako
Veterinarians from Africa
21st-century Malian people